The 2022 FIVB Volleyball Women's Club World Championship was the 15th edition of the tournament. It was held in Antalya, Turkey from 14 to 18 December. Six teams competed in the tournament.

Qualification

Venue

Format

Preliminary round
Six teams divided into two pools of three teams each in a round-robin match. The top two teams of each pool advance to the semifinals.

Final round
Knockout stage. The first ranked team in Pool A plays a semifinal match against the second ranked team of Pool B, and the first ranked team of Pool B plays a semifinal match against the second ranked team of Pool A. The winners of the semifinals play for the Club World Championship title, while the runners-up play for third place in the competition.

Pools composition

Squads

Pool standing procedure
 Number of victories
 Match points
 Sets quotient
 Points quotient
 Result of the last match between the tied teams

Match won 3–0 or 3–1: 3 match points for the winner, 0 match points for the loser
Match won 3–2: 2 match points for the winner, 1 match point for the loser

Preliminary round
All times are Turkey Time (UTC+3:00).

Pool A

|}

|}

Pool B

|}

|}

Final round
All times are Turkish Time (UTC+03:00).

Semifinals
|}

3rd place match
|}

Final
|}

Final standing

Awards

Most Valuable Player

Best Setter

Best Outside Spikers

Best Middle Blockers

Best Opposite Spiker

Best Libero

See also
 2022 FIVB Volleyball Men's Club World Championship

References

External links
Official website

FIVB Volleyball Women's Club World Championship
FIVB Women's Club World Championship
International volleyball competitions hosted by Turkey
FIVB
FIVB